Patricia Ann Cragg is a New Zealand physiologist and full professor and former academic administrator at the University of Otago.

Academic career 
Cragg graduated from the University of Bristol with a BSc and PhD (1976) titled "Respiration and body weight in the reptilian genus Lacerta: A physiological, anatomical and morphometric study".

Cragg moved to New Zealand to take a position with the University of Otago, filling teaching, research and administrative roles over the years. She retired in May 2018. In April 2019 Cragg returned from retirement to be Acting Deputy Vice-Chancellor (Academic) and in December 2019 she was promoted to full professor with effect from 1 February 2020.

Selected publications

References 

Living people
Year of birth missing (living people)
Alumni of the University of Bristol
Academic staff of the University of Otago
New Zealand physiologists
New Zealand women academics
New Zealand women scientists